Limnocottus godlewskii is a species of ray-finned fish belonging to the family Cottidae, the typical sculpins. This fish is endemic to Lake Baikal, Russia; it is a common fish in the lake. It lives at a depth range of 2–830 metres, and inhabits the silty bottom. Males can reach a maximum total length of 19 centimetres.

L. godlewskii spawns in January and February.

References

godlewskii
Fish described in 1874
Fish of Lake Baikal 
Taxa named by Benedykt Dybowski